Chaif (Чайф) is a Russian rock band formed in 1984 in Sverdlovsk (now Yekaterinburg), Russia, by Vladimir Shakhrin and Vladimir Begunov. Their name is derived from the word chai, meaning tea, and kaif (slang word), meaning pleasure. The band reached national fame in 1992 with songs such as Ne Speshi (Don't Hurry) and 17.  By 1997, the popularity of rock music had declined and they were playing smaller venues than at the height of their fame.
They have released several albums and are very popular in Russia and former Soviet states, but they are virtually unknown to the rest of the world.  Their musical styles range from rock and roll to Blues and even some songs which feature a strong reggae influence. The band is still touring and releasing albums occasionally.

After the annexation of Crimea by the Russian Federation, Chaif took part in cultural meeting between delegations from Crimea and Sverdlovsk Oblast. The lead singer of the band, Vladimir Shakhrin, was critical of Andrei Makarevich for supporting Ukraine's position in the conflict. In 2022, the band supported the Russian invasion of Ukraine.

Discography

Magnitoalbums

Studio albums

The Oranzhevoye Nastroenie series

Live albums

Compilations

References

External links 
 

Musical groups established in 1985
Russian rock music groups
Musical groups from Yekaterinburg
Soviet rock music groups
Winners of the Golden Gramophone Award